Habost is the name of two crofting townships on the Isle of Lewis in the Outer Hebrides of Scotland.

It is a traditional area of the Clan Morrison.

Habost Bothan

Most commonly used for social gatherings. The stone structure was a place for the men of Ness to meet and discuss crofting matters. One could describe these shelters as 'drinking dens'. The purpose of the bothan was to be able to have a drink into the late hours of the weekend without worrying about tarnishing your reputation. The men of Ness did not want to be seen drinking as it was frowned upon to drink by the local churches of Ness.

References

Villages in the Isle of Lewis